Ibsen de Castro (17 January 1938 – 30 December 2020) was a Brazilian politician.

Biography
He served as a Deputy from 1983 to 1987 and a member of the Legislative Assembly of Goiás from 1995 to 1999 and 1975 to 1983. de Castro died from COVID-19 in December 2020 in Goiânia during the COVID-19 pandemic in Brazil.

References

1938 births
2020 deaths
Members of the Chamber of Deputies (Brazil) from Goiás
Deaths from the COVID-19 pandemic in Goiás
People from Goiás